Etienne Leroux (13 June 1922 – 30 December 1989) was an  Afrikaans writer and a member of the South African Sestigers literary movement.

Early life and career
Etienne Leroux was born in Oudtshoorn in the Western Cape on 13 June 1922 as Stephanus Petrus Daniël le Roux, son of S.P. Le Roux, a South African Minister of Agriculture. He studied law at Stellenbosch University (BA, LLB) and worked for a short time at a solicitor's office in Bloemfontein. From 1946 he farmed and lived as a writer on his farm in the Koffiefontein district. Etienne was a pupil at Grey College Bloemfontein where he matriculated.

His 1968 Een vir Azazel (One for Azazel in Afrikaans) was translated into English as One for the Devil, and makes use of the Azazel myth.

He died on 30 December 1989, and was buried at the family church yard of Wamakersdrift, of which his farm formed part.

Graham Greene wrote: "His audience will be the audience that only a good writer can merit, an audience which assembles slowly in ones and twos ... the rumour spreads that here an addition will be found to the literature of our time."

Awards
 Hertzog Prize for prose for Sewe dae by die Silbersteins, 1964
 Hertzog Prize for Prose for Magersfontein, O Magersfontein!, 1979 and CNA Literary Award
 CNA Literary Award for Een vir Azazel

List of works
 Die eerste lewe van Colet, 1955
 Hilaria, 1957
 Die mugu, 1959
 Sewe dae by die Silbersteins, 1962
 Een vir Azazel, 1964
 Die derde oog, 1966
 1844, 1967
 Isis, Isis, Isis, 1969
 Na'va, 1972
 Magersfontein, o Magersfontein!, 1976
 Onse Hymie, 1982
 Die Silberstein-trilogie, 1984 (appeared at Penguin as: To a dubious salvation)
Etienne Leroux. Die eerste siklus. Die eerste lewe van Colet - Hilaria - Die mugu.

A biography of Etienne Leroux, by the respected biographer of Afrikaans writers, John Christoffel Kannemeyer, was published in July 2008.

Selected publications
Seven days at the Silbersteins Translated by Charles Eglington. Boston, Houghton Mifflin, 1964.
One for the Devil Translated by Charles Eglington. Boston, Houghton Mifflin, 1968.
The Third Eye Translated by Amy Starke. Boston, Houghton Mifflin, 1969.
18/44 Translated by Cassandra Perrey. Boston, Houghton Mifflin, 1972.
To a dubious salvation: a trilogy of fantastical novels Penguin, 1972.
Magersfontein, O Magersfontein! Translated by Ninon Roets. Hutchinson, 1983.

References

External links
Misterie van die alchemis. 'n Inleiding tot Etienne Leroux se negedelige romansiklus. (By Charles Malan)
 Digital Etienne Leroux Project
 Journal of Southern African Studies Paper on Sewe Dae by die Silbersteins - JSTOR
 SABC news footage of Leroux's funeral on 

1922 births
1989 deaths
South African writers
Sestigers
Afrikaans-language writers
Hertzog Prize winners for prose